The 2018 OFC U-19 Championship was the 22nd edition of the OFC U-19/U-20 Championship.
Before the tournament in 2016, the age limit was reduced by a year to 19 years of age. However, the last tournament remained the name U-20 Championship. For this tournament, the name has changed to U-19 Championship. So, players who wanted to participate in the tournament needed to be born on or after 1 January 1999.

Qualifying stage

Cook Islands
Head coach:

American Samoa
Head coach:

Tonga
Head coach:

Samoa
Head coach:

Group stage

Group A

New Zealand

Head coach:  Des Buckingham

Tahiti

Head coach:  Bruno Tehaamoana

Papua New Guinea

Head coach:  Harrison Kamake

Tonga
Head coach:

Group B

Solomon Islands
Head coach:

New Caledonia
Head coach:

Fiji
Head coach:

Vanuatu
Head coach:

References

OFC U-20 Championship squads